Republic of Korea Army Engineer School is a Republic of Korea Army military engineering school located in Jangseong, South Korea.

References

Republic of Korea Army
Military academies of South Korea
Universities and colleges in South Jeolla Province
1919 establishments in Korea